You Can't Stop Rock 'n' Roll is the second studio album by American heavy metal band Twisted Sister, released in May 1983.

The songs "The Kids Are Back", "I Am (I'm Me)," and the album's title track were released as singles. The album was certified as a Gold Album by RIAA in November 1995, for selling over 500,000 copies in the USA. Metal-rules.com put the album in their list of "The Top 100 Heavy Metal Albums" and on their list of "The Top 50 Glam Metal Albums".

The title track is a new recording of the track "Can't Stop Rock and Roll" which appeared on the compilation "Son of Homegrown" in 1982.

Track listing

Personnel

Twisted Sister
Dee Snider – lead vocals
Jay Jay French – lead & rhythm guitar, backing vocals
Eddie "Fingers" Ojeda – lead & rhythm guitar, backing vocals
Mark "The Animal" Mendoza – bass, backing vocals, studio assistant
A. J. Pero – drums, percussion

Production
Stuart Epps - producer, engineer, mixing

Charts

Album

Singles

Certifications

In popular culture
In series two of Brainiac: Science Abuse, the song "You Can't Stop Rock 'n' Roll" was used in a recurring experiment to show what things could be used to "stop rock 'n' roll". The experiment would consist of a stereo playing the song being destroyed in an overly extreme fashion using various chemicals, objects and explosives to which the presenter would then humorously declare that you can in fact "stop rock 'n' roll" with said method.
In the 2010 film Jackass 3D, "The Kids Are Back" is played during the opening credits.

References

1983 albums
Twisted Sister albums
Atlantic Records albums